Armenian Patriarchate may refer to:

Armenian Catholic Patriarchate of Cilicia
Armenian Patriarchate of Constantinople
Armenian Patriarchate of Jerusalem

See also
List of Armenian Catholic Patriarchs of Cilicia
List of Armenian Patriarchs of Constantinople
List of Armenian Patriarchs of Jerusalem